Sir Robert Bruce, 2nd Baron of Clackmannan & Rate (originally Robert de Bruys;died 23 July 1403) was the son of Sir Thomas Bruce 1st Baron of Clackmannan and Marjorie Charteris of Stenhouse.

Background
Robert Bruce was born in Clackmannan, Scotland the son of Thomas Bruce, 1st Baron of Clackmannan and his wife Marjory.  Robert received more land in Clackmannan in 1359 from his cousin, King David II, and additional land in Rate, Scotland in 1367.

He married Isabel Stewart the daughter of Robert Stewart of Durisdeer, Dumfriesshire, with whom he had five sons and a daughter:
 Robert Bruce, 3rd Baron of Clackmannan;
 Edward Bruce, of Stenhouse, who married Agnes Airth, daughter of Sir William Airth of Airth, circa 1417.
 James Bruce, Bishop of Dunkeld 
 Alexander Bruce
 Thomas Bruce, of Wester Kennet (who had a charter for those and other lands on 2 May 1389); and
 Helen Bruce, who married David Ross of Balnagown.

Robert was captured and killed on 23 July 1403, during the Battle of Shrewsbury, and his son Robert succeeded him as third baron.

Sources

 http://www.brucefamily.com/lineage.htm#clackmannan

Robert Bruce, 2nd Baron of Clackmannan
Robert Bruce, 2nd Baron of Clackmannan
Robert Bruce, 2nd Baron of Clackmannan
Year of birth missing
1403 deaths
Scottish feudal barons